Edmund Hall (by 1519 – 24 November 1592) was an English politician.

He was a Member (MP) of the Parliament of England for Grantham in 1545 and 1547.

References

1592 deaths
Year of birth uncertain
English MPs 1545–1547
English MPs 1547–1552